Lomami National Park is a national park located in the Democratic Republic of Congo in Central Africa. Situated within the middle basin of the Lomami River, it straddles the Provinces of Tshopo and Maniema with a slight overlap into the forests of the Tshuapa and Lualaba river basins. The National Park was formally declared on 7 July 2016. It is the 9th national park in the country and the first to be created since 1992.

Lomami National Park consists of 8,879 km² (887,900 hectares) of tropical lowland rainforest with savanna islands in the south and hills in the west. It is home to several nationally endemic species including Bonobo, Okapi, Congo peafowl, and a newly discovered primate species called Lesula, as well as the rare Dryas monkey known locally as Inoko. An important population of African forest elephant is still protected in the northern part of the park.

History 
The southeastern range of the bonobo (a Congolese endemic great ape found only on the left bank of the Congo River) was unstudied until 2007. On satellite images the probable area appeared as nearly 40,000 km2 of unexplored rainforest showing no roads, human habitation, or agricultural clearings. Working with the Lukuru Foundation, John and Terese Hart, a couple involved in research and conservation of DR Congo's forests since the early 1980s, launched a dugout up the Lomami River in April 2007. On board were several forest teams ready to inventory the area on foot over the next three years. They named the area Tshuapa–Lomami–Lualaba Conservation Landscape (TL2) after the three rivers Tshuapa, Lomami and Lualaba, whose forests they explored. They found much of the outer forests depleted of large animals by the commercial bushmeat trade, but a rich core remained. This area too was threatened by hunters, many coming from far away – even from other Provinces –  to supply the markets with wild meat in the major towns of Kisangani and Kindu.

After the reconnaissance surveys, in close collaboration with traditional authorities and local administrations, the Lukuru team focused on the areas that still contained a diverse and abundant fauna. In the first year, a monkey was encountered that was eventually determined to be new to science, the lesula (Cercopithecus lomamiensis). They found that TL2 was home to populations of other endemic and endangered species such as Okapi, Congo Peacock, Forest Elephant and significant populations of many non-human primate species including the rare dryas monkey and some other interesting phenotypic varieties of known species. All these findings showed an exceptionally rich and interesting eastern edge to the Congo River's central basin forest block.

With meetings in village centers and town halls, with outreach missions led by ministers, chiefs and deputies, the process to establish a national park got underway. From 2010 through 2012, legitimized through Tambiko ceremonies in which the ancestors were consulted, the surrounding villages defined the limits of the national park. By 2013 the governors of both Maniema and Tshopo (Oriental at the time) Provinces declared provincial parks, making all hunting within the parks illegal.

On July 7, 2016, the result of nearly a decade of collaborative work, the Lomami National Park was officially decreed by DR Congo's national government.

Geography 
The Lomami National Park is located in two provinces: Tshopo and Maniema. It lies south of Kisangani, the capital of Tshopo Province, and northwest of Kindu, the capital of Maniema Province.

The Lomami River forms the western border at the southern limit of the park and flows through the center of the northern part of the park. This river – as a biogeographic barrier – has influenced the evolution of wildlife in the region. Two other rivers, Tshuapa and Lualaba, define the general east-west limits of the TL2 landscape.

Edaphic, hydromorphic savannas, emerge from the forest in the southernmost part of the TL2 landscape, whereas forest cover is more consistent in the north, although varying from hill-forest to low elevation upland forest to seasonally flooded forest and riverine forest.

Local population 
The people living in the buffer zone of the Lomami National Park belong primarily to seven different ethnic groups: Lengola, Mbole, Mituku, Langa, Tetela, Ngengele and Arabisé. The approximately 100 small villages live primarily on agriculture, hunting, and fishing.

Biodiversity 
Early exploration in 2007 verified that the southern distribution of bonobos included the east bank of the Lomami River. These bonobos were shown to be genetically distinct from other bonobo populations, establishing the Lomami River as a probable geographic barrier.

Other important populations of rare or endangered animals were found in various parts of the park.

Approximately 500 African forest elephants remain in the northern forests of the park. As in so much of its range, the forest elephant was hunted to local extinction in the south of the park. Also in the north, the Okapi, a rainforest giraffe and Congolese endemic, occurs only on the west bank of the Lomami. This finding raises questions about the historic range of the species since the Okapi is known also on the east bank of Lualaba River but not between the Lomami and Lualaba.

In the south, the dryas monkey is so far (2016) known only from Maniema Province and on the right bank of the Lomami River. Before this discovery, the species distribution was thought to be limited to a small area in Equateur Province, 400 km to the northwest.

Significant agglomerations of grey parrots, a target species for the illegal pet trade, live in and around the park and the endemic Congo Peafowl can be found in forests throughout the park.

The Lomami National Park is outstanding for its ape and monkey species. These following primates can be found in the park:

Bonobo (Pan paniscus)
Tshuapa red colobus (Procolobus tholloni)
Lomami red colobus (Piliocolobus parmentieri)
Sclater's Angolan colobus (Colobus angolensis angolensis)
Northern black mangabey (Lophocebus aterrimus aterrimus)
Katanga red-tailed monkey (Cercopithecus ascanius katangae)
Yellow-nosed red-tailed monkey (Cercopithecus ascanius whitesidei)
De Brazza's monkey (Cercopithecus neglectus)
Lomami river blue monkey (Cercopithecus mitis heymansi)
Congo Basin Wolf's monkey (Cercopithecus wolfi wolfi)
Lomami river Wolf's monkey (Cercopithecus wolfi elegans)
Lesula (Cercopithecus lomamiensis)
Dryas monkey (Cercopithecus dryas)

Threats 
The major threat to wildlife in the Lomami National Park is the commercial bushmeat trade. The Lukuru Foundation found that the origin of hunting pressure is not just the local communities, as many hunters are from other regions and, importantly, the trade is driven by a strong demand from urban markets and city-dwelling traders who come to the villages on bicycles and motorbikes to bargain directly on site. Lukuru Foundation monitoring revealed that about 85% of all the bushmeat from the TL2 landscape in Maniema was transported to the provincial capital of Kindu.

Elephant poaching represents another threat to the park. Commercial ivory trade not only pushes a rapid decline in elephant populations but contributes to facilitate insecurity in remote areas. With military arms and ammunitions, criminal gangs prey not only on the park's wildlife but also on surrounding communities.

References

External links 

 TL2 Project of Lukuru Foundation
 Lukuru Foundation
 ICCN - Institut Congolais pour la Conservation de la Nature
 institut national pour la conservation (in French)

National parks of the Democratic Republic of the Congo
Protected areas established in 2016
2016 establishments in the Democratic Republic of the Congo
Southern Congolian forest–savanna mosaic
Tshopo
Maniema